Veronica Nyaruai Wanjiru (born October 29, 1989 in Nyahururu) is a Kenyan runner who specialises in 1500 metres. She now lives in Kaptagat, where she attends PACE training camp.

She took part at the 2007 world Championships, but was 12th overall and missed the 1500 m final.

In 2008, she would have been eligible to defend her Junior World title, but she placed fourth at the Kenyan trial and was not selected.

She is based at the PACE Sports Management training camp in Kaptagat.

Nyaruai won the Cross Internacional de Venta de Baños in 2009, beating Steph Twell in the process.

Achievements

Personal bests 
1500 metres - 4:08.21 min (2006)
3000 metres - 8:52.9 min (2005)
5000 metres - 15:13.1 min (2005)

Awards 
In the 2005 Kenyan Sports Personality of the Year awards, Wanjiru was selected the most promising sportswoman of the year. She finished third at the sportswoman of the year category, behind Catherine Ndereba and the boxer Conjestina Achieng.

References
 

1989 births
Living people
Kenyan female middle-distance runners
Kenyan female long-distance runners
Kenyan female steeplechase runners
African Games silver medalists for Kenya
African Games medalists in athletics (track and field)
Kenyan female cross country runners
Athletes (track and field) at the 2007 All-Africa Games
Athletes (track and field) at the 2008 Summer Olympics
Olympic athletes of Kenya